The 2019 Women's Premier League Rugby Final was held in Glendale, Colorado on November 3. Glendale Merlins were crowned WPL Champions after defeating Life West Gladiatrix.

Match

Details 

Source:

References 

Women's Premier League Rugby Finals
Women's Premier League Rugby Final
Sports competitions in Colorado